The Indian Music Industry (IMI) is a trust that represents the recording industry distributors in India. It was founded on February 28, 1936, as Indian Phonographic Industry (IPI). It is the 2nd oldest music industry organization in the world that was involved in protecting copyrights of music producers and supporting growth of music entertainment industry. In 1994, it was renamed as Indian Music Industry (IMI) and represented India at the International Federation of the Phonographic Industry (IFPI). It is also registered with the West Bengal Societies Registration Act. All major music labels in India are part of this association. Record companies like Saregama (HMV), Universal Music Group (India), Tips Industries, Sony Music India, Virgin Records, Magnasound Records, Aditya Music, Times Music, Zee Music Company and T-Series several other prominent international, national and regional labels are part of the IMI. The IMI represents over 75% of all legal music sales in India.

IMI has its registered office in Kolkata and Administrative office in Mumbai. It also has offices in New Delhi, Chennai, Bangalore, Hyderabad and other major Indian cities working on the protection of rights of music producers and preventing music piracy. It has also been instrumental in launching the IMMIES music awards in collaboration with MTV.

The Indian music industry is largely dominated by Indian film soundtracks, which account for nearly 80% of the country's music revenue, followed by Indi-pop. As of 2014, the largest Indian music record label is T-Series with up to 35% share of the Indian market, followed by Sony Music India (the largest foreign-owned label) with up to 25% share, and then Zee Music Company (which has a partnership with Sony). As of 2017, 216million Indians use music streaming services such as YouTube, Hungama, Gaana and JioSaavn. T-Series has the world's most-subscribed and most-viewed YouTube channel.

History 
The industry was dominated by cassette tapes in the 1980s and 1990s. In 1990, India had annual cassette sales of 180million units, including both legitimate and pirate sales. This made it the world's second largest cassette market, after the United States.

In the early 2000s, 49million cassettes (including 16million pirate tapes) were sold every month. Later in the 2000s, the industry transitioned to online streaming, bypassing CD and digital downloads.

Criteria of certification levels 

The Indian Music Industry has constituted different, awards to encourage and promote music. The approved scheme of gold/platinum disc standards effective for sound recordings of member companies released in one calendar year is as below:

 Sales of all types of carriers, whether vinyl records, audio cassettes, compact discs, MP3 compact discs, music videos (i.e. excluding home videos) or any other existing or future type of carrier is considered on the basis of one unit.
 If a sound recording contains a combination of two program, any program over half of its total duration can be weighted at 50%, of the sales of the sound recording of that program. Any program comprising less than half of the total duration of the sound recording will not be counted for the purpose of certification.
 Sales in domestic markets only will be considered for the calculation of sales of sound recording.
 The time-limit for achieving above sales in any category is one year from the release of the recording in India.
 Applications should be accompanied by a copy certified by the member's chartered accountant stating the date of release & the number of units sold, along with a letter from the managing director or CEO.

Record charts

International Top 20 Singles 

IMI launched International Top 20 Singles chart, the first official music industry recognised record chart in India, on 21 June 2021. It ranks best-performing international singles in India based on streaming data from Amazon Music, Apple Music, and Spotify. The data is collected and aggregated by BMAT Music Innovators and chart is reviewed by IMI Charts committee. The first number-one song for the chart dated 21 June 2021, was "Butter" by BTS.

Certification levels 

India has separate scales for music recording certifications. Certifications are usually based on sales, like some other Asian countries. Like many other Asian countries, domestic repertoire accounts for the majority of the Indian music market. Like many other countries, sales requirements of music recording in India reduced due to music piracy, declining sales, and the rise of online streaming.

Current
The following are the current certification levels, as of 2019.

Single and album units are measured in terms of Track Equivalent (TE) and Album Equivalent (AE) units, respectively, which are equivalent to the following media units.

Previous
Prior to the inclusion of music streaming in IMI certifications, the following certification levels were in use between 2007 and 2013.

The following certification levels were in use between 2000 and 2007.

The following certification levels were in use up until 2000.

Best-selling albums

Top ten

By decade

References

External links 
 IMI

Music industry associations
Music organisations based in India
Trade associations based in India